The 1945–46 FA Cup was the 65th season of the world's oldest football knockout competition; the Football Association Challenge Cup, or FA Cup for short. The large number of clubs entering the tournament from lower down the English football league system meant that the competition started with a number of preliminary and qualifying rounds. The 25 victorious teams from the Fourth Round Qualifying progressed to the First Round Proper.

The teams that han been exempted until the fourth qualifying round are: Ilford, Lovells Athletic, Shorts Sports, Chelmsford City, Cheltenham Town, Dulwich Hamlet, Gillingham, Guildford City, Leytonstone, Lancaster City, Gainsborough Trinity, Scarborough, North Shields, Shrewsbury Town, Stalybridge Celtic, Runcorn, Walthamstow Avenue, Clapton, Wellington Town, Kidderminster Harriers, Willington, Colchester United, Marine and Workington.

Extra preliminary round

Ties

Preliminary round

Ties

Replays

1st qualifying round

Ties

Replays

2nd replay

2nd qualifying round

Ties

Replays

3rd qualifying round

Ties

Replays

4th qualifying round

Ties

Replays

1945–46 FA Cup
See 1945–46 FA Cup for details of the rounds from the First Round Proper onwards.

External links
 Football Club History Database: FA Cup 1945–46
 FA Cup Past Results

Qualifying
FA Cup qualifying rounds